Orizaba is a city and municipality in the Mexican state of Veracruz. It is located 20 km west of its sister city Córdoba, and is adjacent to Río Blanco and Ixtaczoquitlán, on Federal Highways 180 and 190. The city had a 2005 census population of 117,273 and is almost coextensive with its small municipality, with only a few small areas outside the city. The municipality's population was 117,289 and it has an area of 27.97 km2 (10.799 sq mi).

Naming
It is generally understood that the name Orizaba comes from a Hispanicized pronunciation of the Nahuatl name Āhuilizāpan [a: wi li sa: pan], which means "place of pleasing waters." Another possibility, however, is the word Harish (Jerez de la Frontera, Andalusia, in 16th-century Spanish pronunciation), this place being the hometown of the first Spanish settlers (1521) of Orizaba. Harish or—in a simplified form—Ariz, with the addition (under the influence of the Arabic language) of the gentilic "i" and/or with the ending "aba", meaning fortification, would have become Ariziba or Arizaba, from which Orizaba would have derived. (The word Harish—in turn—is, according to some authors, linked to the capital of Tartessus and could refer to the biblical Tarshish. Its Semitic meaning could be "trading post" or "foundry site", since Tartessus was a major Phoenician center of tin commerce and bronze production.)

Geography and inhabitants
Orizaba has an unusually wet dry-winter subtropical highland climate (Köppen climate classification: Cwb).

The town lies at 1,200 m. (4000 ft.), at the confluence of the Río Blanco with several tributaries, including the Río Orizaba, near the mouth of a large valley heading westward into the eastern Sierra Madre Oriental. This location, at the bottom of the ascent into the mountains, is an important transition point along what has been for centuries the main trade route between Mexico City and Veracruz on the Gulf Coast. in 1938 the upper Río Blanco watershed was designated Cañón del Río Blanco National Park.

The climate is generally pleasant, though often cloudy and rainy, and the soil of the Orizaba valley is extraordinarily fertile. Overlooking the valley from the north is the Pico de Orizaba (Citlaltépetl), a volcano that, at 5,636 m. (18,490 ft.), is the highest mountain in Mexico and third highest in North America.

In the town of Ixhuatlancillo north of Orizaba, and in a large mountainous area to the south (the Sierra de Zongolica), live many thousands of people who speak a variant of Nahuatl which is often called Orizaba Nahuatl (ISO code nlv).

History

Prehistory and conquest 
Orizaba was already an important town at the time of the Spanish conquest, and it was in Orizaba that La Malinche, Hernán Cortés's interpreter and mistress, was married to the Spanish gentleman Juan Jaramillo. A plaque at the Temple of "The Immaculate Conception" in Huiloapan commemorates this event.

Colonial period 
During the colonial period, Orizaba became an important city. On January 27, 1774, the Spanish king Carlos III conceded town status (villa) to Orizaba, and on November 29, 1830 Orizaba was declared a city.

Independence war 
In October 1812, José María Morelos captured the city for the insurgent army. In 1821 to the end of the war, Agustín de Iturbide was in Orizaba before and after the signature of the Treaty of Córdoba in the neighbor city.

Independent period 

When Lucas Alamán established, in 1836, the first textile factory (Cocolapan) of Orizaba, the city started its economic life as an industrial city.

In 1839, the newspaper La Luz was created and Veracruz Governor Francisco Hernández y Hernández gave the name of Veracruz-Llave (remembering the General Ignacio de la Llave, who was born in Orizaba) to the state.

On May 8, 1874, Orizaba was declared the capital city of Veracruz by Governor Apolinar Castillo, but in 1878, the status was transferred to Xalapa.

During the government of Porfirio Díaz, orizaba was declared the most educated city in the state.

In the late years of Díaz's go vernment, two important workers' strikes occurred, those of Cananea and Río Blanco, the latter taking place in Orizaba and being an important prelude to the Mexican Revolution.

The American World War I and World War II transport ship USS Orizaba (ID-1536) was named after the city.

Economy 

The Orizaba's area (including the municipalities of Ixtaczoquitlán, Río Blanco, Nogales and Cd. Mendoza) economy has grown significantly in the last years due to the safety of the area, being of great confidence for national and foreign investors who wants to establish in a safe place. Another important reason is the presence of recognised Universities like Universidad Veracruzana, Instituto Tecnológico de Orizaba or Instituto Tecnológico y de Estudios Superiores de Monterrey Campus Central de Veracruz en Córdoba.
The industry is mainly focused in the following areas: breweries, paper, cement, pharmaceutical, iron and steel sector, soft drinks and food, leather and shoemaker companies among others. Also in the last years the commercial area experiments a significant growth due to the opening of new Malls & Major Retailers.
It is one of the cheapest cities to live and invest in México, as Mercer consultory published in the "Estudio de costo de la vida nacional 2012"; this study includes 42 localities of México, and was done comparing 182 products and services.

The inquiry also disclose that Orizaba's Valley will grow 10% in 2013, due to the lack of pollution, existence of enough water and other points like price of housing.

Main sights

The old city hall El Palacio de Hierro (The Iron Palace) in the centre of the city was designed by Gustave Eiffel and built from 1891 to 1894. Built with 600 tons of Belgian steel, its parts were shipped from Belgium during the Porfiriato (the government of Porfirio Díaz, 1876–1911), to be assembled in Orizaba. The palace cost 100,000 pesos (gold), equivalent to about 21.3 million pesos or 1.1 million USD as of 2019. It was Don Manuel Carrillo Tablas who not only loaned the money to the city, but also had to pay the additional cost of unloading the palace from the port and having it reassembled at its present location, the Plaza de Armas. Unfortunately, Don Manuel died New Year's Eve of 1899 without ever having received a cent from the city for his loan. He was a very charitable man, though, having donated the land where the present Cathedral of Orizaba now stands, as well as the adjacent shopping center known as "El Mercado." El Palacio de Hierro served as the City Hall until the city felt it was not large enough for the growing needs of the local government and therefore moved to its present location.

Orizaba has an important industrial life. There is, for example, the Cervecería Cuauhtémoc Moctezuma company (a brewery), which was established in 1896 in Orizaba.

Other attractions for visitors include:
 The Teleférico or cable-car to the top of Cerro Borrego, which offers views of Pico de Orizaba. A trail to the top of Cerro Borrego is also available. In either case the mountain is most visible in the morning when the eastern sun lights it.
 Río Orizaba, a river that flows through the city, is home to Eco Parque Río which has many wild and domesticated animals that can be seen during a walk along its course. A trail known as the Riverwalk has been built along it.
 The BIORI Jardín Botánico de Orizaba or Orizaba Botanical Gardens has a variety of plants and outdoor art as well as an entire building devoted to growing orchids.

Monuments and buildings 
The Iron Palace
El Palacio Municipal (The City Hall)
The Church of Nuestra Señora Del Carmen
The Church of La Concordia
State Art Museum
Artisan market (Mercado de Artesanías)
Mercado Cerritos, NW Orizaba and Mercado Melchor Ocampo, centro.
Centro Orizaba park (Parque Castillo) and the Theater there has almost nightly free plays or music.
Huge Rock in the Panteon (municipal cemetery).

Notable Orizabeños (people from Orizaba) 
Sara García
Ignacio de la Llave
Salvador Moreno Manzano (1916-1999), composer, art historian and painter
Saúl Sánchez
Alfredo "El Viejo" Sánchez García
Francisco Gabilondo Soler
José Antonio Gómez Rosas
Humberto Vélez
Evita Muñoz a.k.a."Chachita"
Ramón Arnaud 
Gilberto Loyo

References

(Bernal Diaz del Castillo, Historia Verdadera de la Conquista de la Nueva España, Mexico, Pedro Robredo, 1939.)
(Francisco Alvarez de Icaza, Diccionario Autobiografico de Conquistadores y Pobladores de la Nueva España, Madrid, Imprenta de "El Adelantado de Segovia", 1923.)
(Victor M. Alvarez, Diccionario de Invasores, Mexico, D.F., INAH, 1975.)
(Peter Boyd-Bowman, Indice Geobiografico de Mas de 56 Mil Pobladores de la America Hispanica, I: 1493–1519, Mexico, Fondo de Cultura Economica, 1985.)
(Maria del Rosario Casellas Gonzalez, Gonzalo de Sandoval, Segundo Capitan de la Conquista de la Nueva España, Tesis, Departamento de Historia, UNAM, Mexico, 1969.)
(Diccionario Porrua de Historia, Biografia y Geografia de Mexico, Mexico, Editorial Porrua, 1964.)
(Enciclopedia Espasa-Calpe, Barcelona, Espasa Calpe, 1928.)
(Enciclopedia General de Andalucia, España, C&T Editores, c.2010.)
(Gran Enciclopedia de Andalucia, Sevilla, Promociones Culturales Andaluzas, no date.)
(Joaquin Arroniz, Ensayo de una Historia de Orizaba—original edition from 1867--, Mexico, D.F., Fundacion Miguel Aleman, Instituto Veracruzano de la Cultura, 2004.)
(Jose Maria Naredo, Estudio Geografico, Historico y Estadistico del Canton y de la Ciudad de Orizaba, Orizaba, Imprenta del Hospicio, 1898.)
(Carlos Calero, Orizaba, Editorial Citlaltepetl, 1970.)
(Ernesto Lemoine Villicaña, Documentos y Mapas para la Geografia Historica de Orizaba, 1690–1800, Mexico, D.F., Archivo General de la Nacion, 1962.)
(Alberto Gochicoa Gomez, Las Cronicas de Orizaba, Mexico, c.2009.)
("Traza, ocupacion del espacio y segregacion; la morfologia urbana de Orizaba en el siglo XIX", Eulalia Ribera Carbu, in the book "De Veracruz a Puebla, un Itinerario Historico entre la Colonia y el Porfiriato", Carlos Contreras Cruz y Claudia Patricia Pardo Hernandez, editors, Instituto de Investigaciones Dr. Jose Maria Luis Mora, Mexico.)
(Jose Antonio Calderon Quijano, Historia de las Fortificaciones en Nueva España, Madrid, Escuela de Estudios Hispanoamericanos, 1953.)
(Sergio Florescano Mayet, El Camino Mexico-Veracruz en la Epoca Colonial, Xalapa, Centro de Investigaciones Historicas, Universidad Veracruzana, 1987.)
(The Anchor Bible Dictionary, New York, Doubleday, 1992.)
(Eerdmans Dictionary of the Bible, Grand Rapids, Michigan, B. Eerdmans Publishing Co., 2000.)
(Encyclopaedia Judaica, Jerusalem, 1972.)
(The New Encyclopædia Britannica, 15th edition, Chicago, 1990s.)
(Ethelia Ruiz Medrano, Gobierno y Sociedad en Nueva España.)
(Ethelia Ruiz Medrano, Reshaping New Spain.)
(Robert Himmerich Valencia, The Encomenderos of New Spain, 1521–1555.)
(Alvin Eustis, Francois Chevalier, Land and Society in Colonial Mexico.)
(John Michael Francis, Iberia and the Americas—Culture, Politics and History, Vol. 1.)
(David Marles, Wars of the Americas—A Chronology of Armed Conflict in the New World.)
Link to tables of population data from Census of 2005 INEGI: Instituto Nacional de Estadística, Geografía e Informática
Veracruz Enciclopedia de los Municipios de México

External links

Ayuntamiento Constitucional de Orizaba Official website
Orizaba Nahuatl
Pico de Orizaba on Bivouac
Orizaba Regional Portal Culture, Tourism, Pictures, Maps & More.
Museo de Arte del Estado de Veracruz Art Museum of the State of Veracruz (Only in Spanish)
 Pueblos mágicos de Veracruz

Populated places in Veracruz
Nahua settlements
Pueblos Mágicos